Metacrambus salahinellus is a species of moth in the family Crambidae described by Pierre Chrétien in 1917. It is found on Sardinia and in Spain, as well as North Africa, including Morocco, Algeria and Libya.

References

Moths described in 1917
Crambinae
Moths of Europe